This article outlines notable events occurring in 2003 in spaceflight, including major launches and EVAs. The Space Shuttle Columbia disaster occurred on 1 February 2003.

Launches

|colspan=8|

January
|-

|colspan=8|

February
|-

|colspan=8|

March
|-

|colspan=8|

April
|-

|colspan=8|

May
|-

|colspan=8|

June
|-

|colspan=8|

July
|-

|colspan=8|

August
|-

|colspan=8|

September
|-

|colspan=8|

October
|-

|colspan=8|

November
|-

|colspan=8|

December
|-

|}

Deep Space Rendezvous

EVAs

Orbital launch summary

By country

By rocket

By family

By type

By configuration

By spaceport

By orbit

References

Footnotes

 
Spaceflight by year